Brockway is an unincorporated community located in the town of Brockway, Jackson County, Wisconsin, United States. It is located at the intersection of U.S. Route 12 and Wisconsin Highway 27 and shares its northern border with Black River Falls, Wisconsin.

History
The community was named for Eustace L. Brockway, an area sawmill and steamboat operator who served in the Wisconsin legislature in 1872.

Images

Notes

Unincorporated communities in Jackson County, Wisconsin
Unincorporated communities in Wisconsin